The Iwanowo light railway was an approximately  long military light railway with a track gauge of  from Ivatsevichy via Iwanowo to Kamin-Kashyrskyi with two branch lines to the area west of Pinsk.

History 

Route 
The line with a cumulative length of  crossed Polish marsh Polesia in a north-south direction along the early historic Vilnius-Lviv trade route and near the Lviv-Drohiczyn-Slonim (Wolkowysk)-Vilnius mainline. The mainline had been planned to run on a chain of dry sandy islands, when the light railway was being built.

During the World War I, at least the Iwanovo-Lyubeshiv had been completed by August 1916.

In 1939 there were the following stations and connections:
Ivatsevichy near Kosiv (on the Brest-Baranavichy mainline)
Święta Wola(pl) (with a branch to Telekhany)
Ivanava (Janów Poleski) (on the Brest-Pinsk mainline)
Kamin-Kashyrskyi (on the mainline to Kovel)

Locomotives 
At least one of the steam locomotives was built by Borsig in 1919 and delivered to Poland by the Railway Replacement Park Sperenberg, where it was given the Reichsbahn number 99 1563 after the German invasion.

See also 
 Ivanychi-Rachyn light railway

References 

	

Narrow gauge railways in Ukraine
Military railways